Daniel Mossberg (born 19 April 1981) is a Swedish professional bandy midfielder.

Career
Mossberg has played most of his career for Sandvikens AIK, but has also made a number of seasons in different Russian clubs, Zorky 2006–08 and Dynamo Moscow 2011–14.

In 2007, Mossberg signed for Raketa, but the contract was terminated when Raketa went out of money, and Mossberg rejoined Zorky.

In the 2010 Bandy World Championship, he scored the golden goal in the final, giving the game to Sweden with 6–5 against Russia.

Honours

Individual 
 Årets man (1): 2017

References

External links
 
 

Swedish bandy players
Living people
1981 births
Sandvikens AIK players
Zorky Krasnogorsk players
Dynamo Moscow players
Expatriate bandy players in Russia
Sweden international bandy players
Bandy World Championship-winning players